The Macau Refuse Incineration Plant (MRIP;) is an incinerator in Taipa, Macau, China.

History
The plant was commissioned in 1992. In 2009, the waste processing capacity of the plant was doubled.

Architecture
The plant spans over an area of 4.5 hectares.

Technical details
The plant has a waste processing facility of 1,728 tons per day being done by its six incinerators, with the current capacity of 1,400 tons/day.

See also
 Air pollution in Macau

References

1992 establishments in Macau
Buildings and structures in Macau
Environment of Macau
Incinerators
Taipa